This article presents a list of the historical events and publications of Australian literature during 2013.

Events
 James Ley launches the Sydney Review of Books to provide "an opportunity for Australia's critics to rediscover the art of literary criticism".
 The longlist for the inaugural Stella Prize is announced.
 The shortlist of the Miles Franklin Award contains only female writers for the first time.
 Nicole Bourke, writing under the pseudonym "N. A. Sulway", becomes the first Australian writer to win the James Tiptree, Jr. Award for her novel Rupetta.
 Aora Children's Literature Research Centre in Sydney closes after 12 years of operation.

Major publications

Literary fiction 
 Debra Adelaide – Letter to George Clooney
 Steven Carroll  – A World of Other People
 J. M. Coetzee – The Childhood of Jesus
 Richard Flanagan – The Narrow Road to the Deep North
 Andrea Goldsmith – The Memory Trap
 Ashley Hay – The Railwayman's Wife
 Tom Keneally – Shame and the Captives
 Hannah Kent – Burial Rites
 Melissa Lucashenko – Mullumbimby
 Colleen McCullough – Bittersweet 
 Fiona McFarlane – The Night Guest
 Alex Miller – Coal Creek
 Di Morrissey – The Winter Sea
Cory Taylor – My Beautiful Enemy
 Christos Tsiolkas – Barracuda
 Felicity Volk – Lightning
 Tim Winton – Eyrie
 Alexis Wright – The Swan Book
 Evie Wyld – All The Birds, Singing

Children's and young adult fiction
 Alyssa Brugman – Alex as Well
 J. C. Burke – Pretty Girl
 Felicity Castagna – The Incredible Here and How
 Mem Fox – Baby Bedtime
 Mem Fox – Yoo-hoo, Ladybird!
 Kerry Greenwood – Evan's Gallipoli: A Gripping Story of Unlikely Friendship and an Incredible Journey behind Enemy Lines
 Richard Harland – Song of the Slums
 Karen Healey – When We Wake
 Melissa Keil – Life in Outer Space
 Fiona Wood – Wildlife

Science fiction and fantasy
 Max Barry – Lexicon
 Greg Egan – The Arrows of Time
 Jennifer Fallon – Reunion
 Traci Harding – Dreaming of Zhou Gong
 Simon Haynes – Hal Spacejock: Safe Art
 Fiona McIntosh – The Scrivener's Tale
 Juliet Marillier – The Caller
 James Phelan – 13
 N. A. Sulway – Rupetta

Crime and mystery
 Honey Brown – Dark Horse
 Peter Corris – The Dunbar Case
 Garry Disher – Bitter Wash Road
 Karen Foxlee – The Midnight Dress
 Poppy Gee – Bay of Fires
 Katherine Howell – Web of Deceit
 Stuart Littlemore —Harry Curry: Rats and Mice
 Adrian McKinty – I Hear the Sirens in the Street
 Barry Maitland – The Raven's Eye
 Matthew Reilly – The Tournament
 Michael Robotham – Watching You
 Angela Savage – The Dying Beach
 David Whish-Wilson – Zero at the Bone
 Chris Womersley – Cairo

Poetry
 Pamela Brown  – Home by Dark
Lisa Gorton
The Best Australian Poems 2013
 Hotel Hyperion
 John Kinsella – The Vision of Error: A Sextet of Activist Poems
 Kate Middleton – Ephemeral Waters
 Geoff Page
 1953
 New Selected Poems
 Dorothy Porter – The Best 100 Poems of Dorothy Porter
 Chris Wallace-Crabbe – New and Selected Poems

Biography
 Alison Alexander – The Ambitions of Jane Franklin: Victorian Lady Adventurer
 Andrew Burell – Twiggy: The High-Stakes Life of Andrew Forest
 Gabrielle Carey – Moving Among Strangers: Randolph Stow and My Family 
 Matthew Condon – Three Crooked Kings 
 David Day – Flaws in the Ice: In Search of Douglas Mawson 
 Stephen Dando-Collins – Sir Henry Parkes: The Australian Colossus
 Susanna de Vries – Australian Heroines of World War One: Gallipoli, Lemnos and the Western Front
Jesse Fink – The Youngs: The Brothers Who Built AC/DC
 Peter FitzSimons – Ned Kelly: The Story of Australia's Most Notorious Legend
 David Marr – The Prince: Faith, Abuse and George Pell
Kristina Olsson – Boy, Lost: A Family Memoir
 Michael Pembroke – Arthur Phillip: Sailor, Mercenary, Governor, Spy 
 John Safran – Murder in Mississippi: The True Story of How I Met a White Supremacist, Befriended His Black Killer and Wrote this Book
 Margaret Simons – Kerry Stokes: Self-Made Man
 Helen Trinca – Madeleine: A Life of Madeleine St. John
 Clare Wright – The Forgotten Rebels of Eureka

Awards and honours

Lifetime achievement

Literary

Fiction

National

Children and young adult

National

Crime and mystery

National

Science fiction

Non-fiction

Poetry

Drama

Deaths
 23 January – Graham Stone, bibliographer (born 1926)
 23 May – Hazel Hawke, memoirist (born 1929)
 16 July – Christopher Koch, novelist (born 1932)
5 September – Elisabeth Wynhausen, Dutch-born journalist and author (born 1946)
 9 October – Mark "Chopper" Read, writer (born 1954)

See also
 Literature
 List of years in Australian literature
 List of Australian literary awards
 2013 in Australia
 2013 in literature
 2013 in poetry

References

Literature
Australian literature
Australian literature by year
21st-century Australian literature